David Thacker (born 21 December 1950) is an English theatre director. He is married to the actress Margot Leicester.

Education
Thacker studied at the University of York.

Theatre
Thacker was the artistic director at the Octagon Theatre Bolton until July 2015, when he stepped down to become the first Professor of Theatre at University of Bolton. He will continue as associate director, directing two productions per year, until 2018. He has directed over 100 theatre productions including plays by William Shakespeare, Arthur Miller, Samuel Beckett, Henrik Ibsen, Anton Chekhov, Tennessee Williams, Tom Stoppard and Eugene O'Neill.

Background
Thacker has worked at eight producing theatres including the Royal Shakespeare Company (Director-in-Residence), the Young Vic (Director), the Dukes Playhouse, Lancaster (Theatre Director), and the National Theatre. Seven of his productions have transferred to the West End.

He has won Olivier Awards for Best Director (Pericles) and Best Revival (Pericles) and the London Fringe Award for Best Director (Ghosts) and Best Production (Who's Afraid of Virginia Woolf?).

Television
Thacker has directed more than 30 TV productions, including episodes of The Vice, Silent Witness, Foyle's War and Waking the Dead. He has also directed films, such as Measure for Measure, A Doll's House, Broken Glass, The Mayor of Casterbridge and Faith, a film for the BBC set in the Miners' Strike.

References

External links
 

1950 births
Living people
Laurence Olivier Award winners
English theatre directors